Alyxia sinensis is a species of flowering plant in the family Apocynaceae, that is native to China, Vietnam and Taiwan. It is threatened by habitat loss. It grows orange berries and eye shaped, leather-like leaves. The leaves grow in whorls of 3-7 opposite to each other on long twirling vines. Seeds begin forming in approximately 1 month, germinating in just over 4 months.

References

sinensis
Flora of Taiwan
Flora of China
Flora of Vietnam
Taxonomy articles created by Polbot